James Edward Tonner (31 March 1896 – 1985) was a Scottish professional footballer who played as a winger. His brothers Jack and Sam were also professional footballers.

References

1896 births
1985 deaths
Footballers from Glasgow
Scottish footballers
Dunfermline Athletic F.C. players
Leyton Orient F.C. players
Lochgelly United F.C. players
Bo'ness F.C. players
Burnley F.C. players
Hamilton Academical F.C. players
English Football League players
Association football wing halves
People from Bridgeton, Glasgow